Papadindar-e Olya (also Romanized as Pāpādīndār-e ʿOlyā) is a village in Keshvar Rural District, Papi District, Khorramabad County, Lorestan Province, Iran. At the 2006 census, its population was 20, in 8 families.

References 

Towns and villages in Khorramabad County